Ahmad Johar (born 29 March 1958 in Kuwait) is an actor, director and writer.

Biography

He has received Kuwait's State Merit Award for his work as an actor.

He was hospitalized on 21 June 2020 after suffering from a stroke and pulmonary edema.

References

1958 births
Living people
Kuwaiti male actors